David Fanning is an American country music singer, songwriter, and record producer. He is one-fourth of the production team New Voice Entertainment, which has produced for Parmalee and Thompson Square and serves as Jason Aldean's road band.

David Fanning has produced multiple hits (including 10 top 40s and 2 #1s) for the Thompson Square and Parmalee. These hits include three #1's ("Are You Gonna Kiss Me or Not", "If I Didn't Have You", and "Carolina").

In 2014, Fanning signed to Red Bow Records, a division of Broken Bow Records. He released his solo debut single "Drink You Away", a cover of a Justin Timberlake song. Markos Papadatos of Digital Journal gave the song 4.5 stars out of 5. The song debuted at number 60 on the Country Airplay chart dated for the week ending May 24, 2014, and peaked at number 58. Two more singles followed in 2015, "Doin' Country Right" and "What's Next," before Fanning parted ways with Red Bow in 2016.

Fanning released his debut EP First on September 23, 2016 via MV2 Entertainment.

Extended plays

Singles

Music videos

References

American male singer-songwriters
American country singer-songwriters
BBR Music Group artists
Country musicians from Alabama
Living people
People from Limestone County, Alabama
1980s births
21st-century American singers
21st-century American male singers
Singer-songwriters from Alabama